Bafrajerd (also Romanized as Bafrājerd; also known asVarāvard) is a village in Khanandabil-e Sharqi Rural District, in the Central District of Khalkhal County, Ardabil Province, Iran. At the 2006 census, its population was 1,289, in 257 families.

References 

Tageo.com

Towns and villages in Khalkhal County